"Can You Feel It" is a song by American group the Jacksons, recorded in March 1980 and released as the third single from their album Triumph in February 1981.

Written by brothers Michael and Jackie, the song featured solo leads by Randy and Michael. Released as a single in 1981, the song reached No. 77 on the pop charts and No. 30 on the R&B charts in United States, but reached No. 6 in the UK and No. 2 in the Netherlands in 1981.

Record World said that "Dynamic strings join Michael and Randy's vocal drama to provide memorable musical suspense."

Personnel
Written and composed by Michael Jackson and Jackie Jackson
Produced by the Jacksons
Lead vocals: Michael & Randy Jackson
Arrangement by Michael & Jackie Jackson
String arrangement by Tom Tom 84
Instrumentation:
Keyboards: Greg Phillinganes, Ronnie Foster, Bill Wolfer (uncredited)
Guitars: Tito Jackson, David Williams
Bass: Nathan Watts
Drums: Ollie E. Brown
Vibes: Gary L. Coleman
Background vocal coordinator and choir director: Stephanie Spruill
The Children's Choir: Yolanda Kenerly, Brigette Bush, Audra Tillman, Lita Aubrey, Rhonda Gentry, Roger Kenerly II, Soloman Daniels, Brian Stilwell, Gerry Gruberth, Peter Wade
The Adults' Choir: Stephanie Spruill, Paulette McWilliams, Bunny Hull, Carolyn Dennis, Venetta Fields, Josie James, Paulette Brown, Carmen Twillie, Lisa Roberts, Phyllis St. James, Roger Kenerly-Saint, Ronald Vann, Louis Price, Gregory Wright, Arnold McCuller, Roy Galloway, Jim Gilstrap, Gerry Garrett, Bob Mack, Tyrell (Rock) Deadrick

Charts

Music video
The accompanying video, entitled "The Triumph," was noted for its special effects created by Robert Abel and Associates. Michael created the video's concept and Tito's sons Taj and Taryll appeared as extras. In 2001, it was voted one of the 100 best videos of all time, in a poll to mark the 20th anniversary of MTV.  The title was also used for a 2009 greatest hits compilation. The video was featured on the bonus disc of the box set, Michael Jackson's Vision.  The prelude narration is spoken by voice-over artist Ken Nordine.

In popular culture
The track was sampled by The Tamperer featuring Maya for their 1998 hit single Feel It.

A cover version of the song appeared in a 2018 holiday advertising campaign for Amazon.com.

References

External links 
 
 

1980 songs
1981 singles
The Jackson 5 songs
Songs written by Michael Jackson
Songs written by Jackie Jackson
Post-disco songs
Epic Records singles